Intracellular parasites are  microparasites that are capable of growing and reproducing inside the cells of a host.

Types of parasites 
There are two main types of intracellular parasites: Facultative and Obligate.

Facultative intracellular parasites are capable of living and reproducing in or outside of host cells. Obligate intracellular parasites, on the other hand, need a host cell to live and reproduce. Many of these types of cells require specialized host types, and invasion of host cells occurs in different ways.

Facultative
Facultative intracellular parasites are capable of living and reproducing either inside or outside cells.

Bacterial examples include:
Bartonella henselae
Francisella tularensis
Listeria monocytogenes
Salmonella Typhi
Brucella
Legionella
Mycobacterium
Nocardia
Neisseria
Rhodococcus equi
Yersinia
Staphylococcus aureus

Fungal examples include:
Histoplasma capsulatum.
Cryptococcus neoformans
Blastomyces dermatitidis

Obligate 

Obligate intracellular parasites cannot reproduce outside their host cell, meaning that the parasite's reproduction is entirely reliant on intracellular resources.

Obligate intracellular parasites of humans include:

Viruses
Certain bacteria, including:
Chlamydia, and closely related species.
Rickettsia
Coxiella
 Certain species of Mycobacterium such as Mycobacterium leprae, that survive in phagocytes
 Anaplasma phagocytophilum
Certain protozoa, including:
Apicomplexans (Plasmodium spp., Toxoplasma gondii and Cryptosporidium parvum)
Trypanosomatids (Leishmania spp. and Trypanosoma cruzi)
Certain fungi
Pneumocystis jirovecii

The mitochondria in eukaryotic cells may also have originally been such parasites, but ended up forming a mutualistic relationship (endosymbiotic theory).

Study of obligate pathogens is difficult because they cannot usually be reproduced outside the host. However, in 2009 scientists reported a technique allowing the Q-fever pathogen Coxiella burnetii to grow in an axenic culture and suggested the technique may be useful for study of other pathogens.

Exceptions 
Polypodium is a metazoan intracellular parasite, distinct from most if not all other intracellular parasites for this reason.

Invasion 
When an intracellular parasite goes to enter a host cell, it is particular about the type of host cell. This is because most intracellular parasites are able to infect only a few different cell types. The entrance of these host cells will differ between intracellular parasites. Not all intracellular parasites will enter a cell the same way. Some will work with specific components in or on the host cell, an example being Trypanosoma cruzi. This parasite will attach itself to the host cell while increasing the intracellular calcium, which in turn disrupts the actin at the site of attachment, causing the host cell to create a lysosomal-barrier around the disruption. The parasite will take advantage of this membrane and produce a vacuole in the host cell.  Other intracellular parasites have developed different ways to enter a host cell that do not require a specific component or action from within the host cell. An example is intracellular parasites using a method called gliding motility. This is the use of an actin-myosin motor that is connected to the intracellular parasites' cytoskeleton.

Nutrition 
The majority of intracellular parasites must keep host cells alive as long as possible while they are reproducing and growing. In order to grow, they need nutrients that might be scarce in their free form in the cell. To study the mechanism that intracellular parasites use to obtain nutrients, Legionella pneumophila, a facultative intracellular parasite, has been used as a model. It is known that Legionella pneumophila obtains nutrients by promoting host proteasomal degradation. Self-degradation of host proteins into amino acids provides the parasite with its primary carbon and energy source.

Susceptibility 
People with T cell deficiencies are particularly susceptible to intracellular pathogens.

See also
 Myzocytosis

Notes

References 

Parasitology
Endoparasites